Charles Gordon Rowe (30 June 1915 – 9 June 1995) was a New Zealand cricketer who played in one Test match in 1946 against Australia. He also represented New Zealand at hockey.

Life and career

Early life and war service
Rowe was born at Glasgow in Scotland in 1915 and died at Palmerston North in New Zealand in 1995 aged 79. He served overseas in the New Zealand Army in the Second World War. At the time he was a policeman in Auckland.

Cricket
A middle-order batsman, Rowe made his first-class cricket debut in 1944–45, and had played six first-class matches for Wellington before being selected for the Test team, having scored 324 runs at an average of 27.00 runs per innings, with his top score of 72 made against Otago at Wellington. He had also scored 102 and 79 in a non-first-class match for Wellington against Canterbury in 1944–45.

In his Test match, also played in Wellington, he was dismissed for a pair, bowled by Bill O'Reilly each time. He is one of the ten players to be dismissed for a pair in their only Test. The only other New Zealander in that list is Len Butterfield, who played in the same match.

He played no further first-class matches for six seasons, but returned to captain Central Districts in 1952–53. He had little success with the bat, but in his last match he led the team to an innings victory against Otago, which ensured Central Districts second place in the Plunket Shield.

Rowe stood as an umpire in three matches in the 1982 Women's Cricket World Cup held in New Zealand.

Hockey
Rowe was also a hockey player. He represented New Zealand against India in 1938. He scored four goals when Wairarapa defeated the touring Australian team 6–3 at Masterton in August 1948. He retired from representative hockey in 1958.

See also
 List of Test cricketers born in non-Test playing nations

References

External links

1915 births
1995 deaths
New Zealand Test cricketers
New Zealand cricketers
Central Districts cricketers
Wellington cricketers
Cricketers from Glasgow
New Zealand male field hockey players
Scottish emigrants to New Zealand
New Zealand military personnel of World War II